Frozen is a 2007 black-and-white Indian drama film directed by Shivajee Chandrabhushan. The original screenplay written by Shanker Raman, based on a story by Chandrabhushan and starring Danny Denzongpa, Gauri, and Skalzang Angchuk. The film was shot entirely on location at Ladakh, India.

It was featured at the various international film festivals, including the 2007 London Film Festival and Dubai International Film Festival, and was the official selection at 2007 Toronto International Film Festival and 2008 San Francisco International Film Festival, and Palm Springs International Film Festival.

At the 55th National Film Awards, it was awarded the Indira Gandhi Award for Best Debut Film of a Director and Best Cinematography.

Plot
The film is a sombre journey of imaginative and impulsive teenager, Lasya (Gauri), who lives with her father Karma (Danny), an apricot jam-maker and younger brother Chomo (Angchuk) in a remote village in the Himalayas. Pristine snow-capped mountains surround their tiny hamlet and barren harsh land stretches for miles into nowhere. One day the army moves in, settles a hundred yards across their doorstep. The last bit of comfort the family draws from their familiar surroundings changes into a harsh, ceaseless, irreversible conflict. The film depicts the life of this family whose dreamlike existence is interrupted by insurmountable odds, one after the other.

Cast
Danny Denzongpa as Karma
Gauri Kulkarni as Lasya
Skalzang Angchuk Gultuk as Chomo
Shakeel Khan as Romeo
Rajendranath Zutshi as Dawa
Yashpal Sharma as Sharma
Aamir Bashir as Commanding Officer
Denzil Smith as Tenzing
Sanjay Swaraj as Salim
Anuradha Baral as Sita
Sonam Stobgias Gorky as Rinpoche
Shilpa Shukla as Karma's Wife
Wangchuk Dorjey Mogul as Officer Wangchuk
Stanzin Jordan as Vicky
Manish Mathur as Performing Artiste

Production
The film was shot in Ladakh, then part of Jammu and Kashmir, India, in February 2006, over 34 days at an average height of 15,000 ft above sea level. The film was shot in colour and was digitally intermediated to black and white. The house where the film was picturised was built at Stakmo, behind Thiksey Monastery.

Production company: Seagull Media Productions, Phat Phish Motion Pictures ( Shivajee Chadrabhushan, and Gauri Kulkarni and another person are the owners of Seagull media Productions and these two are frauds and cheated the third person. They have taken money for this film and the film "palak" and not even returned one rupee after receiving millions of rupees from the third partner. Please beware of these frauds and stake away from them)
Production Design: Sonali Singh, Siddarth Sirohi	 	
Sound Design: Vivek Sachidanand
Sound Editor: Renganaath Ravee
Art Direction: Dawa Tsering
Costume Design: Loveleena Jain
Editing: Shan Mohammed

Reception
A review by Dennis Harvey of Variety, said  that film's director's "background as a photographer and mountaineer,  -- is evident in every frame of directorial debut "Frozen.".

Though the film had been going through Film Festival circuit since 2007 when the film was ready, its commercial release however happened in May 2009, during the stand off between producers and multiplexes, which resulted in number of films coming out of cold storage.

Awards and nominations
The film has won (or been nominated for) the following awards:

 Won
National Film Awards
 Indira Gandhi Award for Best Debut Film of a Director - Shivajee Chandrabhushan
 National Film Award for Best Cinematography - Shanker Raman 
Durban International Film Festival - Best Cinematography - Shanker Raman 
Osian-Cinefan Film Festival, Delhi - Special Jury Award  

 Nominated
International Thessaloniki Film Festival - Golden Alexander (Best Film) - Shivajee Chandrabhushan
Asian Film Award for Best Cinematographer - Shanker Raman

References

External links

Film Review Passion for Cinema.
Movie stills

Indian black-and-white films
2007 drama films
2007 films
Films scored by John P. Varkey
2000s Hindi-language films
Ladakhi-language films
Films shot in Ladakh
Films whose cinematographer won the Best Cinematography National Film Award
Best Debut Feature Film of a Director National Film Award winners
Films set in Ladakh